Sauherad is a former municipality in Telemark county, Norway.  It is part of the traditional region of Midt-Telemark.  The administrative centre of the municipality is the village of Akkerhaugen.  The municipality borders Kongsberg, Skien, Nome, Bø, and Notodden.

The parish of Søfde (later spelled Saude, then Sauherad) was established as a municipality on 1 January 1838 (see formannskapsdistrikt). The area of Luksefjell was transferred from Sauherad to Gjerpen in 1847.

General information

Name
The municipality (originally the parish) is named after the old Sauar farm (Old Norse: Sauðar), since the first church was built here. The name is the plural form of sauðr which means "spring" or "issue of water". The meaning of the combination Sauherad (Old Norse: Sauðaherað) is "the district (herað) of Sauðar". Prior to 1918, the name was written "Saude" or (before 1862) "Søfde".

Coat-of-arms
The coat-of-arms is from modern times.  They were granted in 1989. The arms show a gold-colored apple tree on a blue background. It was designed by Halvor Holtskog.

Transportation
Railway - Both the Sørland Line and the Bratsberg Line run through Sauherad. The Bratsberg Line runs as part of the Sørland Line between Hjuksebø and Nordagutu. Nordagutu Station is the only operating station left in Sauherad.
Roads - Riksvei 36 and 360 goes through Sauherad, and so does Fylkesvei 44, 151, 551, 553, and 555. In 2008, all roads and streets got names, as one of the last municipalities in Norway.

Notable residents
 Enevold Steenblock Høyum (1775–1830) military officer, rep. at the Norwegian Constitutional Assembly
 Targjei Augundsson (1801 – 1872) known as Myllarguten (meaning the Millerboy), a fiddle player
 Hans Aimar Mow Grønvold (1846–1926) a Norwegian civil servant and music writer
 Lars Fykerud (1860–1902) a Norwegian Hardanger fiddler and composer
 Sverre Granlund DCM (1918–1943) a Norwegian commando during WWII
 Arne Haukvik (1926–2002), politician and founder of the Bislett Games
 Liv Holtskog (1934 in Gvarv - 2014) Norwegian fruit farmer and poet
 Johannes Akkerhaugen (born 1939) an archer, competed at the 1972 Summer Olympics

Sauherad church

Sauherad church (Sauherad kirke) dates from the medieval era. The church was built between 1150 and 1250. The edifice is of stone and has 260 seats. The church is built in Romanesque style. On the ridge, in the middle of the gable roof, sits a turret. The church bells are from 1441. The altarpiece from 1663 is of Renaissance style.   In 1781 the building was extended westward. In 1830 the church received a new interior. The frescoes in the nave were uncovered and restore during the 1940s and 1950s.

Attractions

Events

 Sauheraddagane (since 1993)
 Kartfestivalen (Kart Festival, since 2005)
 Norsk Eplefest (Norwegian apple festival, since 2006)

Buildings

 Blæksås fortress (3-5th century)
 Bratningsborg fortress (3-5th century)
 Steinborg fortress (3-5th century)
 Evju Bygdetun (Museum)
 Nes stone church (12th century)
 Sauherad stone church (12th century)

Villages

Akkerhaugen
Gvarv
Hjuksebø
Holtsås
Hørte
Nordagutu

Sister cities
The following cities are twinned with Sauherad:
  Karlsborg, Västra Götaland County, Sweden

References

External links

Municipal fact sheet from Statistics Norway

 
Midt-Telemark
2020 disestablishments in Norway